

cia-cib
ciadox (INN)
Cialis (Eli Lilly and Company)
ciamexon (INN)
cianergoline (INN)
cianidanol (INN)
cianopramine (INN)
ciapilome (INN)
Cibacalcin (Ciba-Geigy)
cibenzoline (INN)

cic

cica
cicaprost (INN)
cicarperone (INN)

cicl

cicla-cicli
ciclacillin (INN)
ciclactate (INN)
ciclafrine (INN)
ciclazindol (INN)
ciclesonide (INN)
cicletanine (INN)
ciclindole (INN)
cicliomenol (INN)

ciclo
ciclobendazole (INN)
ciclofenazine (INN)
cicloheximide (INN)
ciclonicate (INN)
ciclonium bromide (INN)
ciclopirox (INN)
ciclopramine (INN)
cicloprofen (INN)
cicloprolol (INN)
Cicloral (Hexal Australia) [Au], also known as ciclosporin
ciclosidomine (INN)
ciclosporin (INN)
ciclotizolam (INN)
ciclotropium bromide (INN)
cicloxilic acid (INN)
cicloxolone (INN)

cico-cicr
cicortonide (INN)
cicrotoic acid (INN)

cid-cil
Cida-Stat
cideferron (INN)
cidofovir (INN)
cidoxepin (INN)
cifostodine (INN)
ciglitazone (INN)
ciheptolane (INN)
ciladopa (INN)
cilansetron (INN)
cilastatin (INN)
cilazapril (INN)
cilazaprilat (INN)
cilengitide (USAN)
cilmostim (INN)
cilnidipine (INN)
cilobamine (INN)
cilobradine (INN)
cilofungin (INN)
cilostamide (INN)
cilostazol (INN)
Ciloxan
ciltoprazine (INN)
ciluprevir (USAN)
cilutazoline (INN)

cim
cimaterol (INN)
Cimehexal (Hexal Australia) [Au], also known as cimetidine
cimemoxin (INN)
cimepanol (INN)
cimetidine (INN)
cimetropium bromide (INN)
cimoxatone (INN)

cin
Cin-Quin

cina-cinm
cinacalcet (USAN)
cinaciguat (INN)
cinalukast (INN)
cinametic acid (INN)
cinamolol (INN)
cinanserin (INN)
cinaproxen (INN)
cinchocaine (INN)
cinchophen (INN)
cinecromen (INN)
cinepaxadil (INN)
cinepazet (INN)
cinepazic acid (INN)
cinepazide (INN)
cinfenine (INN)
cinfenoac (INN)
cinflumide (INN)
cingestol (INN)
cinitapride (INN)
cinmetacin (INN)
cinnovex (INN)

cinn-cinu
cinnamaverine (INN)
cinnamedrine (INN)
cinnarizine clofibrate (INN)
cinnarizine (INN)
Cinnasil
cinnofuradione (INN)
cinnopentazone (INN)
Cinobac
cinoctramide (INN)
cinolazepam (INN)
cinoquidox (INN)
cinoxacin (INN)
cinoxate (INN)
cinoxolone (INN)
cinoxopazide (INN)
cinperene (INN)
cinprazole (INN)
cinpropazide (INN)
cinromide (INN)
Cintichem Technetium 99m Hedspa
cintramide (INN)
cintredekin besudotox (USAN)
cinuperone (INN)

cio-cir
cioteronel (INN)
cipamfylline (INN)
ciprafamide (INN)
Cipralan
cipralisant (USAN)
ciprazafone (INN)
ciprefadol (INN)
Cipro HC
Cipro
ciprocinonide (INN)
Ciprodex
ciprofibrate (INN)
ciprofloxacin (INN)
ciprokiren (INN)
cipropride (INN)
ciproquazone (INN)
ciproquinate (INN)
ciprostene (INN)
ciproximide (INN)
Ciproxin
ciramadol (INN)
cirazoline (INN)
Circanol
cirolemycin (INN)

cis-ciz
Cis-MDP
cisapride (INN)
cisatracurium besilate (INN)
cisconazole (INN)
cismadinone (INN)
cisplatin (INN)
cistinexine (INN)
citalopram (INN)
Citanest Forte
Citanest Plain
Citanest
citatepine (INN)
citatuzumab bogatox (INN)
citenamide (INN)
citenazone (INN)
Cithalith-S Syrup
citicoline (INN)
citiolone (INN)
Citracal
Citrihexal (Hexal Australia) [Au], also known as calcitriol
Citrotein
Citrucel
cixutumumab (USAN, INN)
cizolirtine (INN)